The Toolebuc Formation is a geological formation that extends from Queensland across South Australia and the Northern Territory in Australia, whose strata date back to the Albian stage of the Early Cretaceous. Dinosaurs, pterosaurs, plesiosaurs, ichthyosaurs, protostegid turtles, sharks, chimaeroids and bony fish remains are among the fossils that have been recovered from the formation.

Description 
Deposition occurred in a cool to temperate inland sea setting and the present lithology is dominantly made up of limey shales with abundant Inoceramus bivalve shells. Ichthyosaurs and protostegid turtles were the most common marine reptiles at this time in the Eromanga Sea, in contrast to older Aptian deposits such as the Bulldog Shale of South Australia, which show that plesiosaurs were previously more abundant and also more diverse. The Toolebuc Formation is one of the richest known sources of Mesozoic vertebrate fossils in Australia, with notable collecting areas situated around the towns of Richmond, Julia Creek, Hughenden and Boulia.

Fossil content 
Possible indeterminate ankylosaurid remains are present in Queensland, Australia. Indeterminate ornithopod remains have also been found in Queensland, Australia.

Animals

See also 
 List of dinosaur-bearing rock formations
 Paja Formation, Kronosaurus and Platypterygius Lagerstätte in Colombia
 Sierra Madre Formation, contemporaneous fossiliferous formation of Mexico
 Santana Group, contemporaneous Lagerstätte in northeastern Brazil
 Crato Formation
 Romualdo Formation

References

Bibliography 
 
 

Geologic formations of Australia
Cretaceous System of Australia
Early Cretaceous Australia
Albian Stage
Aptian Stage
Limestone formations
Mudstone formations
Shale formations
Shallow marine deposits
Lagoonal deposits
Fossiliferous stratigraphic units of Oceania
Paleontology in Queensland